Anthidium ordinatum is a species of bee in the family Megachilidae, the leaf-cutter, carder, or mason bees. Males can be expected to be 26 millimeters long, while females can be expected to be 20-22 millimeters long.

References

ordinatum
Insects described in 1879